Néstor Emanuel Moiraghi (born 19 April 1985 in Cipolletti, Argentina) is an Argentine footballer who plays as a centre-back for Agropecuario.

Club career
He has previously played for Dinamo Tirana in Albania during the 2005–2006 season, which is his only time spent playing in Europe in his entire career.

On 31 January 2011, he signed a new deal with the Uruguayan side Defensor Sporting.

References

External links

1985 births
Living people
Argentine footballers
Argentine expatriate footballers
Association football defenders
People from Cipolletti
Club Atlético Lanús footballers
FK Dinamo Tirana players
Rampla Juniors players
UA Maracaibo players
Olimpo footballers
Defensor Sporting players
Newell's Old Boys footballers
Deportivo Cali footballers
Club Atlético Tigre footballers
San Luis de Quillota footballers
Club Agropecuario Argentino players
Uruguayan Primera División players
Argentine Primera División players
Categoría Primera A players
Primera B de Chile players
Argentine expatriate sportspeople in Albania
Argentine expatriate sportspeople in Uruguay
Argentine expatriate sportspeople in Venezuela
Argentine expatriate sportspeople in Colombia
Argentine expatriate sportspeople in Chile
Expatriate footballers in Albania
Expatriate footballers in Uruguay
Expatriate footballers in Venezuela
Expatriate footballers in Colombia
Expatriate footballers in Chile